Giannis Gyrichidis (born 9 March 1974) is a retired Greek football midfielder.

References

1974 births
Living people
Greek footballers
Anagennisi Giannitsa F.C. players
Ionikos F.C. players
Panachaiki F.C. players
A.O. Kerkyra players
Niki Volos F.C. players
Olympiacos Volos F.C. players
Kozani F.C. players
Doxa Drama F.C. players
Polykastro F.C. players
Aetos Skydra F.C. players
Super League Greece players
Association football midfielders
Footballers from Giannitsa